Carlos Alberto Menjívar Aguilar, Jr. (born April 13, 1981) is retired a Salvadoran American footballer who last played for Santa Tecla F.C.

Club career
In his early years, Menjívar spent a year at the famous Tahuichi Academy in Bolivia, before playing at the American Global Soccer School and college soccer in his native California. In 2002, he joined Salvadoran giants FAS, making his debut in June 2002 against Mexican side UANL Tigres. He then left for league rivals Águila, only to return to FAS after a year. In 2007, he moved to Once Municipal and had a stint at Isidro Metapán before moving to Municipal Limeño with whom he relegated to the Second Division. In 2010, he signed for Juventud Independiente, with whom he clinched promotion to the Primera División de Fútbol de El Salvador in 2011.

International career
Menjívar made his debut for El Salvador in a November 2002 friendly match against the United States and has earned a total of 16 caps, scoring no goals. He has represented his country at the 2003 UNCAF Nations Cup as well as at the 2003 and 2007 CONCACAF Gold Cups.

His final international match was a June 2007 CONCACAF Gold Cup game against Trinidad & Tobago.

Coaching Career
Carlos has been coaching youth for the past 6 years
2010-United Futbol Club
2012-2014 Temecula Hawks
2014-2015 San Diego State University Director of Operations Men's Soccer
2016- MVLA Soccer Club 
2017- PDL-Burlingame Dragons Assistant Coach

Honours
Primera División de Fútbol de El Salvador: 3
 2002 Clausura, 2002 Apertura, 2003 Apertura

References

External links
 
Profile - El Gráfico 

1981 births
American soccer players
Salvadoran footballers
American sportspeople of Salvadoran descent
Citizens of El Salvador through descent
El Salvador international footballers
Association football midfielders
2003 UNCAF Nations Cup players
2003 CONCACAF Gold Cup players
2007 CONCACAF Gold Cup players
San Diego State Aztecs men's soccer players
C.D. FAS footballers
C.D. Águila footballers
Once Municipal footballers
A.D. Isidro Metapán footballers
Soccer players from San Francisco
Living people